Microvaranops is a Middle Permian synapsid of the family Varanopidae from the Abrahamskraal Formation of South Africa.  It includes one species, Microvaranops parentis, which was probably arboreal. A slab containing five specimens of Microvaranops indicates that it gathered or lived in groups.

References

Varanopids
Prehistoric synapsid genera
Fossil taxa described in 2018